Eric Christian Olsen (born May 31, 1977), is an American actor. He is known for his portrayals of Investigator Marty Deeks on the CBS television series NCIS: Los Angeles, and of Austin in the film Not Another Teen Movie.

Early life
Olsen was born in Eugene, Oregon, the son of Jeanne (née Donstad), a non-denominational chaplain, and Paul V. Olsen, a professor of English, and head track and cross country coach of Augustana College in Rock Island, Illinois. He has an older brother, David, who acts as his stunt double; David is married to actress and Olsen's NCIS: Los Angeles costar Daniela Ruah. Olsen is of Norwegian descent. Olsen spent most of his childhood in Bettendorf, Iowa, and attended Bettendorf Middle and High School, where he pursued interests such as sports, Japanese, and Chinese.  In addition to many local theatre performances, Olsen trained in improv with ComedySportz Quad Cities and later joined the cast.

Career
Olsen's first starring role was the titular role in the 1999 TV movie Arthur's Quest, soon after he gave an Emmy submitted portrayal of a dying burn victim on NBC's ER. His next role was a small one in HBO's Black Cat Run. Eric soon landed a starring role in the Fox TV series Get Real, playing Cameron Green. The series lasted for a year before Eric made his transition onto the big screen when he played Ben Affleck's gunner in Pearl Harbor, that was quickly followed by a leading role as Austin "The Cocky Blond Guy" in the teen send up feature film Not Another Teen Movie.

Olsen next played Jake in the teen comedy The Hot Chick.  In 2003, he won the role of Lloyd Christmas in Dumb and Dumberer: When Harry Met Lloyd, the prequel to the hit movie Dumb and Dumber.  Olsen followed that up by playing opposite Chris Evans for a second time in Cellular.  He starred in the yet to be released Mojave and then joined the final season of Fox's Tru Calling. He claimed three highly contrasting roles in 2006 and 2007 with the release of Beerfest, License to Wed and Zach Braff's The Last Kiss. Olsen co-starred as Sully in the Fox sitcom The Loop. Olsen had four other projects in 2008 and continues to reside in Malibu, California.

In 2009, he appeared in several episodes of the first season of the Community sitcom, as Vaughn, a usually shirtless, neo-hippie student, musician, and athlete. Olsen appeared on Will Ferrell and Adam McKay's streaming video website Funny or Die, with a small series of segments featuring a character called Perry Hilton, a parody of Paris Hilton. He starred in the 2011 science-fiction horror film The Thing.

Olsen portrays Detective Marty Deeks on the CBS show NCIS: Los Angeles. His character appeared in two episodes of season one before joining the cast as a series regular in the second season. Olsen's sister-in-law, Daniela Ruah, is one of his co-stars.

Olsen is a producer of a short film "Bald" from 2014 and executive producer of a documentary "Andy Irons: Kissed by God" from 2018. He has his own production company Cloud Nine Productions. In 2019 he started his first show as an executive producer picked up in production for Hulu called "Woke".

Olsen made his writing debut with the season 11 episode 10 (the 250th overall episode) of NCIS: Los Angeles titled "Mother", which aired December 1, 2019.

Personal life
Olsen became engaged to actress Sarah Wright in October 2011. They were married near Jackson Hole, Wyoming, on June 23, 2012.  They have a son and two daughters.

Olsen and Wright were featured in a 2015 episode of the HGTV series House Hunters buying a vacation home near Jackson Hole. Olsen works with the charity Hats Off for Cancer as an Honorary Board Member and Spokesperson, featured on their Public Service Announcement video. He and his wife Sarah are members of Board of Directors of Environmental Media Awards.

Filmography

Film

Television

Music videos

Awards and nominations
Young Artist Awards
2000: Nominated, "Best Performance in a TV Series – Young Ensemble" with Jesse Eisenberg, Kyle Gibson, Anne Hathaway in Get Real.

Teen Choice Awards
2003: Nominated, "Choice Movie Chemistry" with Derek Richardson in Dumb and Dumberer: When Harry Met Lloyd.

Razzie Awards
2003: Nominated, "Worst Screen Couple" with Derek Richardson in Dumb and Dumberer: When Harry Met Lloyd.

Prism Awards by Entertainment Industries Council
2014: Nominated, "Male Performance in a Drama Series Multi-Episode Storyline" in NCIS: Los Angeles.

References

External links

American people of Scandinavian descent
Living people
American male film actors
American male television actors
American people of Norwegian descent
People from Bettendorf, Iowa
Male actors from Iowa
20th-century American male actors
21st-century American male actors
Bettendorf High School alumni
1977 births